Nigor Mortis is the seventh studio album by Sananda Maitreya (formerly Terence Trent D'Arby). It is available as MP3 files and on CD format, exclusively from his on-line web store. The CD version is housed in a DVD keep case with an enclosed 8 page photo booklet.

Overview
The project was recorded in Milan, Italy, where the artist has lived since 2002, over the course of five studio sessions.

All songs are written, arranged, produced and performed by Sananda Maitreya. Two songs ("With A Girl Like You" and "Angel (Not A Saint)") have the participation of Lucio Fabbri on fiddle and banjo. Maitreya plays the four basic instruments of rock music: drums, bass, guitar and keyboards.

The name "Nigor Mortis" represents the state between rigor mortis and "vigor mortis", from the stiffness of a corpse to the vitality of life.

An instrumental version of the album is also available, on MP3 only.

Track listing
"O Lovely Gwenita" - 3:18
"This Town" - 3:37
"With a Girl Like You" - 3:44
"I Never Knew How Much" - 3:39
"At the Crossroads" - 5:35
"A Wife Knows" - 3:27
"These Stones" - 2:51
"If I Just Stay With You" - 3:39
"Has It Been Too Quiet?" - 3:27
"Free Me" - 3:21
"I Don't Give a Fuck About You" - 2:57
"Mrs. Gupta" - 4:19
"Ooh Carolina" - 3:02
"Family Reunion" - 1:55
"Where Did the Money Go?" - 1:50
"Because You've Changed" - 3:18
"Superstar" - 3:03
"December in the Rain" - 3:05
"Angel (Not a Saint)" - 3:00
"What Would You Like?" - 3:44
"Cowboys & Injuries" - 2:03
"Priscilla" - 2:27
"The Lost Highway" - 3:47

References

External links
 Sananda Maitreya website

2009 albums
Terence Trent D'Arby albums